Hong Kong Phooey is an American animated television series produced by Hanna-Barbera Productions and originally broadcast on ABC. The original episodes aired from September 7 to December 21, 1974, and then in repeats until 1976. The show was brought back in reruns in 1978 and 1981, and was included in the USA Network's Cartoon Express block throughout the '80s. The main character, Hong Kong Phooey, is the clownishly clumsy secret identity of Penrod "Penry" Pooch, working at a police station as a "mild-mannered" janitor under the glare of Sergeant Flint, nicknamed "Sarge".

Penry disguises himself as Hong Kong Phooey by jumping into a filing cabinet – in so doing he always gets stuck, and is unstuck by his striped pet cat named Spot – and once disguised, gets equipped with the "Phooeymobile" vehicle that transforms itself into a boat, a plane or a telephone booth, depending on the circumstances.

In fighting crime, he relies on his copy of The Hong Kong Book of Kung Fu, a correspondence-course martial-arts instruction handbook. However, his successes are only either thanks to Spot, who provides a solution to the challenges, or the direct result of a comically unintended side effect of his efforts. The humor of the incompetence of Hong Kong Phooey is a recurring theme of each episode. The backgrounds were designed by Lorraine Andrina and Richard Khim.

Synopsis
Each episode begins with Rosemary, the somewhat ditzy telephone operator, getting a call about a crime which she explains to Sergeant Flint. Penry, the janitor, overhears the conversation and proceeds to transform himself into the crime-fighting canine (on whom Rosemary has a crush) by slipping into the hidden room behind the vending machine, then jumping into the bottom drawer of his filing cabinet, getting stuck, and, with help from Spot, coming out of the top drawer.

After sliding behind an ironing board to the floor below, he bounces off an old sofa, through an open window, into a dumpster outside, and emerges driving his Phooeymobile. Even when he crashes into, harms, or otherwise inconveniences a civilian, the passer-by feels honored, as opposed to being annoyed or embarrassed, when they see who did it. One example was when he drove the Phooeymobile through wet cement, splattering the workers: they responded that it was an honor to have a whole day's work ruined by "the great Hong Kong Phooey". Despite his blatant lack of talent or intelligence, Hong Kong Phooey is feared by criminals and admired by citizens, but disliked by Sergeant Flint who sees him only as a hindrance to the police, and as evidenced in the final episode "Comedy Cowboys", Flint takes pleasure in arresting the framed hero (though he is later exonerated).

Production
Hong Kong Phooey is voiced by Scatman Crothers. Sergeant Flint is voiced by Joe E. Ross, who was best known as Officer Gunther Toody in the early 1960s television series Car 54, Where Are You? As Flint, Ross revived Toody's famous "Ooh! Ooh!" exclamation, which he had also used when playing mess sergeant Rupert Ritzik, in The Phil Silvers Show.

The final episode, "Comedy Cowboys", was intended as a backdoor pilot for a new series. In this two-part episode, several new cartoon characters, who are named Honcho, The Mystery Maverick, and the Posse Impossible, appear and help to clear Hong Kong Phooey of a crime. These characters later appear in their own continuing segment, "Posse Impossible" on CB Bears. Like many animated series created by Hanna-Barbera in the 1970s, the show uses the limited Hanna-Barbera laugh track.

Music
The show's opening theme, titled "Hong Kong Phooey", was written and composed by Hoyt Curtin, William Hanna, and Joseph Barbera, and sung by Crothers himself. For the end credits, a shortened instrumental version of the same song was used. A cover performed by Sublime is included on the 1995 tribute album Saturday Morning: Cartoons' Greatest Hits, produced by Ralph Sall for MCA Records.

Episodes

Home media
On August 15, 2006, Warner Home Video released the complete series on 2-disc DVD in Region 1. The DVD set includes commentary on select episodes as well as a documentary of the show from its development through its legacy. The set also includes production designs, never-before-seen original artwork, new interviews, and the special feature Hong Kong Phooey—The Batty Bank Gang: The Complete Storyboard. The series is also available in the UK as a Region 2 two-disc set, and as two separate volumes in Region 4. The shorts "Car Thieves" and "Zoo Story" were also released on a 1970s Saturday morning cartoon compilation.

Voice cast
 Scatman Crothers as Hong Kong Phooey/Penrod "Penry" Pooch
 Kathy Gori as Rosemary
 Joe E. Ross as Sergeant Flint
 Don Messick as Spot, The Narrator, Additional Voices

Additional voices

 Daws Butler
 Richard Dawson
 Ron Feinberg
 Bob Holt
 Casey Kasem
 Jay Lawrence
 Peter Leeds
 Allan Melvin
 Alan Oppenheimer
 Robert Ridgely
 Fran Ryan
 Hal Smith
 Jean Vander Pyl
 Lee Vines
 Janet Waldo
 John Stephenson
 Lennie Weinrib
 Frank Welker
 Paul Winchell
 Paul Lynde

Other media
With a copyright of 2001, Alan Lau, in conjunction with Wildbrain.com, produced a flash animation webshow cartoon that was prominently featured on CartoonNetwork.com, and could still be found there as of the middle of June 2015. While Penry appears identical to the original incarnation, Hong Kong Phooey is a much larger, cut, and highly competent and skilled fighter—even without Spot the cat. Hong Kong Phooey faces off against and easily defeats evil anthropomorphic animals: a trio of rabbits, what appears to be a crane, and a reptilianoid (that appears to be a Komodo dragon). At the end he morphs back to Penry with a smile and sparkle in his eye.

Film
 On July 12, 2009, it was announced that David A. Goodman had been hired to write the screenplay for a Hong Kong Phooey film to be released by Warner Bros. Pictures. Alex Zamm was slated to direct, and Broderick Johnson, Andrew Kosove, Brett Ratner, and Jay Stern were identified as producers. According to the announcement, Alcon Entertainment would back the film. It was announced on August 10, 2011, that Eddie Murphy would be voicing Penry/Hong Kong Phooey in the film. On December 28, 2012, test footage of the film was leaked, showing a computer generated character in live action scenery.  no further information has been revealed since, and the film has likely been canceled.
 Hong Kong Phooey briefly appears on the side of an arcade machine in the film Scoob! (2020).

TV series
 Hong Kong Phooey/Penrod "Penry" Pooch appears in the TV series Laff-A-Lympics, with Scatman Crothers reprising his role. He is a member of the "Scooby Doobies", which consists of characters from Hanna-Barbera's shows from the 1970s. Hong Kong Phooey was selected as a replacement for the title character from Jeannie, as legal issues with Columbia Pictures (who owned the rights to the I Dream of Jeannie characters through their television division) prevented the Jeannie characters from appearing in the show.
 Hong Kong Phooey made a cameo in the "Agent Penny" episode of the Super Secret Secret Squirrel segment of 2 Stupid Dogs.
 To date, Hong Kong Phooey has appeared in two segments on Robot Chicken:
 "Enter the Fat One (Part 2)", in the episode "S&M Present", where he fights Joey Fatone in a karate tournament.
 "Laff-A-Munich", in the episode "Ban on the Fun", in a segment that spoofs Laff-A-Lympics in the style of the 1972 Munich massacre and the film based on the massacre.
 Hong Kong Phooey made a cameo in the Duck Dodgers episode "K-9 Quarry". He was amongst the poached Hanna-Barbera characters on the Alien Hunter's ship.
 Hong Kong Phooey/Penrod "Penry" Pooch appears in the new Wacky Races episode "Hong Kong Screwy", voiced by Phil LaMarr. The racers encounter him in China and help him fight the forces of the evil organization K.I.T.T.Y. led by Golden Paw. Hong Kong Phooey's origin was also revealed.
 In the 2003 episode of Malcolm in the Middle, "Future Malcolm", Malcolm helps a misanthropic man he played chess with in the park get an interview at the drug store where his mother works. In response to the question, "Why here?", Malcolm responds, "Because this is the only guy I know that would trade a job interview for a Hong Kong Phooey lunchbox."
 Hong Kong Phooey will appear in Jellystone!.

Music
 The Bloodhound Gang song "Why's Everybody Always Pickin' on Me?" describes a person as looking "like Chewie, Baba Booey and Hong Kong Phooey all in one."
 The Moldy Peaches song "Nothing Came Out" mentions Hong Kong Phooey among other cartoons: "I want you to watch cartoons with me. He-Man, Voltron, and Hong Kong Phooey."
 The song "Sugarcane" by the Space Monkeys mentions the side-effect of drugs as being "Quicker than the human eye or Hong Kong Phooey."
 The song "Old School" by Danger Doom, features a few classic cartoon mentions. One of these is a mention of Phooey by rapper MF Doom in the line "Ooh Wee, like a Hong Kong Phooey Kick", reminiscing about his childhood.

Literature
The children's novella Hong Kong Phooey and the Fortune Cookie Caper by Jean Lewis, illustrated by Phil Ostapczuk, was published in 1975 by Rand McNally and Company, as well as Hong Kong Phooey and the Bird Nest Snatchers (1976) and Hong Kong Phooey and the Fire Engine Mystery (1977). Hong Kong Phooey's Hidden Pictures book by Tony Tallarico was published by Tempo Books in 1976.

Art
In January 2015, a street art ceramic mosaic of Hong Kong Phooey sold at a Sotheby's auction for HK$2 million. The copy sold was a re-creation by the artist Invader after the original was removed from a city wall by Hong Kong authorities.

Comics
Charlton Comics published seven issues of a Hong Kong Phooey comic book during the show's run. Much of the art was produced by Paul Fung Jr.

The character appeared in 2017 in Scooby-Doo Team-Up #51-52 digital comic (released in print as #26).

In 2018, a re-imagined version of Hong Kong Phooey appeared alongside Black Lightning in the DC comic book Black Lightning/Hong Kong Phooey Special #1.

See also
 List of works produced by Hanna-Barbera Productions
 List of Hanna-Barbera characters

References

External links
 
 Hong Kong Phooey Fanriffic Zone – Featuring an interview with Kathy Gori, voice of Rosemary the telephone operator
 Hong Kong Phooey at Don Markstein's Toonopedia. Archived from the original on February 5, 2016.
 Big Cartoon DataBase: Hong Kong Phooey
 Hong Kong Phooey – Profile on Hong Kong Phooey
 Hong Kong Phooey – Cartoon Network Department of Cartoons (Archive)
 InternationalHero Hong Kong Phooey tribute

1974 American television series debuts
1974 American television series endings
1970s American animated television series
American Broadcasting Company original programming
American children's animated action television series
American children's animated adventure television series
American children's animated comedy television series
American children's animated superhero television series
Animated television series about dogs
Dog superheroes
English-language television shows
Fictional janitors
Fictional Shaolin kung fu practitioners
Hanna-Barbera superheroes
Martial arts television series
Parody superheroes
Television shows adapted into comics
Television shows adapted into films
Television shows adapted into novels
Television series by Hanna-Barbera
Hanna-Barbera characters
Comedy franchises
Male characters in animation